Mlangali is an administrative ward in Ludewa District, Njombe Region, Tanzania. According to the 2002 census, the ward has a total population of 16,260.

References

Wards of Njombe Region